Sophorose is a disaccharide, a dimer of glucose. It differs from other glucose dimers such as maltose in having an unusual β-1,2 bond. It was isolated in 1938 from pods of Sophora japonica. It is a component of sophorolipids. It is a product of the caramelization of glucose.

References 

Disaccharides